Eagles Nest Lake is located east of Inlet, New York. The outlet creek flows into Seventh Lake. Fish species present in the lake are brook trout, and lake trout. There is access by trail from Eighth Lake Campground.

References

Lakes of New York (state)
Lakes of Hamilton County, New York